Liubomiras Laucevičius (born 15 June 1950) is a Lithuanian actor. He has appeared in more than fifty films since 1979.

Selected filmography

References

External links 

1950 births
Living people
Lithuanian male film actors